This is a list of Danish princes from the establishment of hereditary monarchy by Frederick III in 1648. Individuals holding the title of prince would usually also be styled "His Royal Highness" (HRH) or "His Highness" (HH).

List of Danish princes since 1648

References 

Danish princes
Danish monarchy
Princes